Small Steps is the second album by the hip-hop group Heiruspecs. It was released in March 2002  on Interlock Records.

Track listing
"And"  – 2:04
"Meters"  – 4:01
"The Fall"  – 2:13
"Memory"  – 2:03
"In Regrets" featuring Slug  – 5:17
"Opus 1"  – 1:54
"June" featuring New MC (Kanser)  – 4:06
"All Fall Down"  – 5:48
"Small Steps"  – 7:14
"Commonwealth" featuring P.O.S. (7Bombs/Doomtree)  – 2:23
"The Part About The Treason"  – 1:33
"Work"  – 3:24
"Elliot"  – 2:50
"Traction" featuring Qwazaar (Typical Cats)  – 6:56

References

2002 albums
Heiruspecs albums